The Women's Road Race at the 2004 Summer Olympics (Cycling):

The peloton finally split on the penultimate lap, with a small group going clear that contained a number of the favourites, and two Australian cyclists, Sara Carrigan and Oenene Wood. When Carrigan broke from this group on the final lap, only Judith Arndt was able or willing to chase her down, and the pair stayed clear until the end, Carrigan out sprinting Arndt for the line. Russian sprinter Olga Slyusareva won the chase for bronze ahead of Wood and Nicole Cooke of Britain, who had had to work hard to catch up with the chasing group after hitting a barrier on the final lap. 
The 2000 Olympic champion, Leontien Zijlaard-van Moorsel of the Netherlands clipped another rider and crashed out on the penultimate lap.

Date: 15 August

Start: 15:00

Results

References

External links
Official Olympic Report

W
Cycling at the Summer Olympics – Women's road race
2004 in women's road cycling
Women's events at the 2004 Summer Olympics